The City of Bradford Metropolitan District Council elections were held on Thursday, 6 May 1999, with one third of the council up for election. Since the previous election there had been a by-election resulting in Labour successfully defending their seat in Little Horton. Labour retained control of the council.

Election result

This result had the following consequences for the total number of seats on the council after the elections:

Ward results

References

1999 English local elections
1999
1990s in West Yorkshire